Mexicable is an aerial lift line in Ecatepec de Morelos, in Greater Mexico City. It was created by the Government of the State of Mexico.

The first part of this project was inaugurated on October 4, 2016. It reduces traveling times between those points to 17 minutes, down from the hour-long commutes between the same points using ground transportation.

The Mexicable operates 184 cars, each with a capacity 10 passengers. The predicted capacity is 3,000 passengers per hour for each line and 29,000 passengers per day, with a fare of 9 pesos as of July 2020.

The New York Times reported in 2016 that the Mexicable has brought some urban renewal to the areas served by stations. Streetlights were installed, roads were paved, and about 50 murals were commissioned along the route.

Station list

Line 1
{| class="wikitable"
|-
! width="160px" | Stations
! Connections
! Location
! Picture
! Date opened
|-
|  Santa Clara
| 
  Line IV: Santa Clara station
| rowspan=7| Ecatepec de Morelos
| 
| rowspan=7| October 4, 2016
|-
|  Hank González
| 
 Line 2 (under construction)
| 
|-
|  Fátima
| rowspan=5|
| 
|-
|-
|  Tablas del Pozo
| 
|-
|  Los Bordos
| 
|-
|  Deportivo
| 
|-
|  La Cañada
|  
|}

Line 2
{| class="wikitable"
|-
! width="160px" | Stations
! Connections
! Location
! Picture
! Date opened
|-
|  Hank González
| 
 Line 1
| rowspan=4|Ecatepec de Morelos
| 
| rowspan=7| Expected late 2022/early 2023
|-
| La Mesa
| rowspan=3|
| 
|-
| Dr. Jorge Jiménez Cantú
| 
|-
| San Isidro
| 
|-
| Periférico
|
  Line IV: Periférico station
| rowspan=2| Tlalnepantla de Baz
| 
|-
| Torre de Agua
|  
|-
|  Indios Verdes
| 
 Line 1: Indios Verdes station
 Indios Verdes
 : Line 1: Indios Verdes station
 : Line 3: Indios Verdes station
 : Line 7: Indios Verdes station
  Line IV: Indios Verdes station
  Line 3: Indios Verdes station
 Routes: 101, 101-A, 101-B, 101-D, 102, 107-B (at distance), 108
| Gustavo A. Madero, Mexico City
| 
|}

See also
Cablebús, a similar system operating in the neighboring Mexico City.

Notes

References

External links
 Official site (in Spanish)
 

2016 establishments in Mexico
Ecatepec de Morelos
Gondola lifts in Mexico